Winchester is a locality in the Isaac Region, Queensland, Australia.

Geography 
Winchester sits on a major coal deposit in the Bowen Basin. There are a number of coal mines operating there (and beyond into adjacent localities), including Peak Downs Mine, Peak Downs East Mine, Eagle Downs Mine, and Winchester Mine. The Goonyella railway line provides transport from the mines to the ports.

History 
The locality was named and bounded on 16 June 2000.

References 

Isaac Region
Coal mining regions in Australia
Localities in Queensland